Master Boy may refer to:
Chūka Ichiban! a managa also known as Cooking Master Boy
Masterboy, a music group